The 1928 United States presidential election in Vermont took place on November 6, 1928, as part of the 1928 United States presidential election which was held throughout all contemporary 48 states. Voters chose four representatives, or electors to the Electoral College, who voted for president and vice president.

Vermont voted for the Republican nominee, Secretary of Commerce Herbert Hoover of California, over the Democratic nominee, Governor Alfred E. Smith of New York. Hoover's running mate was Senate Majority Leader Charles Curtis of Kansas, while Smith ran with Senator Joseph Taylor Robinson of Arkansas.

Hoover took 66.87% of the vote, to Smith's 32.87%, a margin of 34%.

Vermont historically was a bastion of liberal Northeastern Republicanism, and by 1928 the Green Mountain State had gone Republican in every presidential election since the founding of the Republican Party. From 1856 to 1924, Vermont had had the longest streak of voting Republican of any state, having never voted Democratic before, and this tradition continued amidst a third consecutive nationwide Republican landslide in 1928.

While Hoover won the state in a decisive landslide, Smith's performance nevertheless represented a dramatic Democratic improvement in the state. In 1924, Vermont had been the most Republican state in the union, with Republican Calvin Coolidge winning 78.22% to only 15.67% for Democrat John W. Davis, a massive margin of 62.55%. Vermont, like New England and the Northeast as a whole, swung strongly toward the Democrats in 1928, even as Hoover won another decisive Republican victory nationally. Thus in the 1928 election, Vermont fell to being only the fifth most Republican state in the nation after Kansas, Michigan, Maine and Washington, about 16% more Republican than the national average.

Hoover carried thirteen of the state's fourteen counties, many by large margins. However, the three northwestern counties of Vermont would by 1932 become staunch Democratic enclaves in an otherwise Republican state, and in 1928 movement toward the Democratic Party in this region would first manifest itself, as Smith won over the votes of urban and ethnic Catholic working class voters. In 1928, Smith became the first Democrat to win Chittenden County, the state's most populous county, home to the state's largest city, Burlington. Just four years earlier, in 1924, Republican Calvin Coolidge had received over 70% of the vote in the county. The county would remain under control of the Democrats in presidential elections until Dwight D. Eisenhower won it in 1952.

Results

Results by county

See also
 United States presidential elections in Vermont

References

Vermont
1928
1928 Vermont elections